Sathyam is a 1980 Indian Malayalam film, directed by M. Krishnan Nair. The film stars Sreenath, Sathaar, Premji and Cochin Haneefa in the lead roles. The film has musical score by A. T. Ummer.

Cast 
Sreenath
Sathaar
Premji
Cochin Haneefa
Shanthi Krishna
Kuthiravattom Pappu
Renu Chandra

Soundtrack
The music was composed by A. T. Ummer and the lyrics were written by Bichu Thirumala.

References

External links
 

1980 films
1980s Malayalam-language films
Films directed by M. Krishnan Nair
Films scored by A. T. Ummer